Countess Friederike Amalie of Schlieben (28 February 175717 December 1827) was the consort of Friedrich Karl Ludwig, Duke of Schleswig-Holstein-Sonderburg-Beck.

Early life
Friederike was born in Königsberg, Kingdom of Prussia and was the second and youngest daughter of Count Karl Leopold of Schlieben and his wife, Countess Marie Eleonore von Lehndorff (1722-1800).

Marriage and issue
Friederike married Friedrich Karl Ludwig, Duke of Schleswig-Holstein-Sonderburg-Beck, son of Prince Karl Anton August of Schleswig-Holstein-Sonderburg-Beck and his wife Countess Charlotte zu Dohna-Schlodien, on 9 March 1780 in Königsberg. Friederike and Friedrich Karl Ludwig had three children: Princess Friederike of Schleswig-Holstein-Sonderburg-Beck (13 December 1780 – 19 January 1862), Princess Luise of Schleswig-Holstein-Sonderburg-Beck (28 September 1783 – 24 November 1803), and Friedrich Wilhelm, Duke of Schleswig-Holstein-Sonderburg-Glücksburg (4 January 1785 – 27 February 1831).

Ancestry

References

Friederike
1757 births
1827 deaths
Nobility from Königsberg
German countesses
German duchesses
German princesses
Von Schlieben family